Mysterious Journeys is a paranormal television series that aired on the Travel Channel. Similar to Weird Travels (on the same channel), In Search Of..., and Is It Real? (on the National Geographic Channel), the show explores a variety of topics often considered pseudoscientific or paranormal, covering everything from ghosts, monsters, and UFOs to strange disappearances and historical locations. The show is usually presented through interviews, reenactments and scene footage, with narration by Dellums.

The show premiered on March 20, 2002 and ran a limited 4 episode season, halting production until 2007 when an additional 10 episodes aired. The show has since halted production and it is unknown if any further episodes will air, as there is little to no information available on the Travel Channel's website.

Cast and crew
Erik Todd Dellums - Narrator
Ron Zimmerman - Director (2002)
Joe Swift - Executive Producer (2002)
Mike Mathis - Producer (2002)
Vera Golakova - Supervising Producer (2002)
Joshua Finn - Segment Producer (2002)
Kurt Knutsen - Post Supervisor (2002)
Megan Peterson - Writer/Director/Producer (2007)
Elizabeth Browde - Executive Producer (2007)
Valerie W. Chow - Executive Producer/Supervising Producer (2007)
Tom Rogan - Executive Producer (2007)
Lawrence Williams - Producer (2007)
Cassie Lambert - Segment Producer (2007)

Episodes

Season 1 (2002)

Season 2 (2007)

Reception
The ratings of Mysterious Journeys have been positive, gaining a 4.5 out of 5 on TVGuide.com.

References

External links
Mysterious Journeys at TVGuide.com
Mysterious Journeys on Mahalo.com

Travel Channel original programming
Television series by Authentic Entertainment
Paranormal television